Christian Dotremont, (12 December 1922 – 20 August 1979), was a Belgian painter and poet who was born in Tervuren, Belgium. He was a founding member of the Revolutionary Surrealist Group (1946) and he also founded COBRA together with Danish artist Asger Jorn. In this capacity he was responsible for bringing Henri Lefebvre's Critique de la vie quotidienne (1946) to the group's attention. He later became well known for his painted poems (French: Peinture mots), which he called logograms.

He died of tuberculosis in Buizingen.

Gallery

References

Bibliography
 Labisse (1946)
 Les jambages au cou (1949)
 Cobra 1948 - 1951 - with an introduction by Christian Dotremont, (1980, Jean-Michel Place)
  (1986)

External links
 5 Logograms in translation 

1922 births
1979 deaths
People from Tervuren
Belgian painters
Abstract painters
Belgian poets in French
20th-century deaths from tuberculosis
Tuberculosis deaths in Belgium
20th-century Belgian poets
Belgian male poets
20th-century Belgian male writers